Richard Hurst (died 1805) was a British stage actor.

He appeared in a number of London and provincial theatres during a lengthy career. From 1765 to 1780 he was a member of the Drury Lane company under the management of David Garrick and then Richard Brinsley Sheridan. In 1769 he appeared in Garrick's The Jubilee, a celebration of William Shakespeare.

Selected roles
 Tigranes in Zenobia by Arthur Murphy (1768)
 Sidasco in Zingis by Alexander Dow (1768)
 Arcas in The Grecian Daughter by Arthur Murphy (1772)
 Corea in Braganza by Robert Jephson (1775)
 Raymond in The Battle of Hastings by Richard Cumberland (1778)
 Asciano in The Law of Lombardy by Robert Jephson (1779)

References

Bibliography
 Highfill, Philip H, Burnim, Kalman A. & Langhans, Edward A. A Biographical Dictionary of Actors, Actresses, Musicians, Dancers, Managers, and Other Stage Personnel in London, 1660-1800: Volume VIII. SIU Press, 1973.
 The Plays of David Garrick: Volume II, 1767-1775. SIU Press, 1980.

18th-century English people
English male stage actors
British male stage actors
18th-century English male actors
18th-century British male actors
1805 deaths